Lake Caliraya is a man-made lake situated in the municipalities of Lumban, Cavinti, and Kalayaan in Laguna province, Philippines. Created in 1939, the lake has developed as a popular spot for water sports and outdoor recreation including fishing.  Surrounding the lake are a number of resorts and vacation homes which cater to tourists.

History

Lake creation
Lake Caliraya was created after the construction of Caliraya Dam, an embankment dam started in 1939 by US Army Corps of Engineers Chief in the Philippines, Lieutenant Colonel (later Major General) Hugh J. Casey, with the approval of Philippine Commonwealth President Manuel L. Quezon. The Caliraya River was dammed at its outlet from a large flat plateau area providing a large water reservoir for generating hydroelectric power for Southern Luzon. Large penstocks were constructed diverting water down to the powerhouse below, with  tailrace to the bay. The high head permitted the use of high-speed turbines and generators at relatively low unit costs. Initial estimate for the project was $5 million, or 10 million pesos, and an output of 40,000 horsepower.

World War II
During World War II, the dam was sabotaged by retreating Americans to prevent use by invading Japanese who rebuilt it, then, themselves sabotaged it as their own defeat approached. It was rebuilt and inaugurated in 1953 by the National Power Corporation (NAPOCOR).

Development of the area
Lake Caliraya was rediscovered in the late 60's by the Nieto and De Padua families who then popularized the lake to Manila's elite and expatriate communities. By the acquisition and consolidation of land titles surrounding the lake, they constructed a residential resort subdivision known as Sierra Lakes and the Dos Lagos Club for residents (now known as Lagos del Sol). Property values increased even more so when the main road to the lake was paved courtesy of a grant from the Japanese government and the refurbishing of the hydroelectric plant in 2004. Lake Caliraya eventually became a high-end neighborhood of vacation homes for the rich and famous.

During the 1980s, Lake Caliraya's surroundings were occupied by the local squatters and bandits posing as NPA New People's Army, which affected tourism and development.  Nevertheless, since 1985, there has been major real estate developed with the construction of several small resorts and Caliraya Springs, a golf course and country club. Despite the proliferation of squatters on the roadside due to the negligence of government agencies such as the DPWH (Dept of Public Works and Highways) and Napocor (National Power Corporation), Caliraya continues to be a haven for the rich and the elite, with activities including largemouth bass fishing, wind surfing, kite boarding, wake boarding, jet skiing, water skiing, boating, golf, camping, and other sporting and recreational outdoor activities. Property values remain high, and a new generation of developments, both private and commercial, are slowly coming onstream.

Geography and geological phenomenon
Lake Caliraya is situated approximately 1,200 feet above sea level, and is perched high in the Sierra Madre. The lake experiences cool climate all year round. Winds start blowing in Lake Caliraya from the beginning of September up to late May.

Lake Caliraya's bottom, as well as the surrounding hills, are characterized by a reddish clay topsoil. The lake's floor has a very soft clay bottom.  Local residents of the lake's surroundings still tell stories about certain areas in the lake that are reputed to have sucked boats down - an unfounded claim typical among superstitious locals.

Lake surroundings and islands
The lake's surroundings have been compared to various North American resorts, as suggested by the abundance of pine trees which were introduced by some of the early developers to replace many of the coconut trees, as well as year-round cool climate, and verdant hills. Also, numerous islands of various shapes and sizes have been formed during the creation of the dam lake. All are unnamed. The biggest island is approximately as big as Rizal Park, while the smallest is actually a sandbar about 3 square meters often submerged during high water. This tiny island can be viewed from Lagos del Sol Resort.

Bass fishing
The early developers (Kalaw, Nieto and the De Padua families) seeded the lake with largemouth bass, and through the years, the lake has remained the most popular bass fishing spot in the country.

See also
 Caliraya Dam

References

External links
 

Caliraya
Caliraya
Sierra Madre (Philippines)
Landforms of Laguna (province)
Tourist attractions in Laguna (province)